Gromadka  is a village in Bolesławiec County, Lower Silesian Voivodeship, in south-western Poland. It is the seat of the administrative district (gmina) called Gmina Gromadka.

The village has an approximate population of 2,150.

From 1975 to 1998 Gromadka was in Legnica Voivodeship.

References

Gromadka